Imhotep ("(the one who) comes in peace"; fl. late 27th century BCE) was an Egyptian chancellor to the Pharaoh Djoser, possible architect of Djoser's step pyramid, and high priest of the sun god Ra at Heliopolis. Very little is known of Imhotep as a historical figure, but in the 3,000 years following his death, he was gradually glorified and deified.

Traditions from long after Imhotep's death treated him as a great author of wisdom texts and especially as a physician. No text from his lifetime mentions these capacities and no text mentions his name in the first 1,200 years following his death. Apart from the three short contemporary inscriptions that establish him as chancellor to the Pharaoh, the first text to reference Imhotep dates to the time of Amenhotep III. It is addressed to the owner of a tomb, and reads:

It appears that this libation to Imhotep was done regularly, as they are attested on papyri associated with statues of Imhotep until the Late Period. Wildung (1977) explains the origin of this cult as a slow evolution of intellectuals' memory of Imhotep, from his death onward. Gardiner finds the cult of Imhotep during the New Kingdom sufficiently distinct from the usual offerings made to other commoners that the epithet "demigod" is likely justified to describe his veneration.

The first references to the healing abilities of Imhotep occur from the Thirtieth Dynasty onward, some 2,200 years after his death.

Imhotep is among the few non-royal Egyptians who were deified after their deaths, and until the 21st century, he was one of nearly a dozen non-royals to achieve this status. The center of his cult was in Memphis. The location of his tomb remains unknown, despite efforts to find it. The consensus is that it is hidden somewhere at Saqqara.

Historicity
Imhotep's historicity is confirmed by two contemporary inscriptions made during his lifetime on the base or pedestal of one of Djoser's statues  and also by a graffito on the enclosure wall surrounding Sekhemkhet's unfinished step pyramid. The latter inscription suggests that Imhotep outlived Djoser by a few years and went on to serve in the construction of Pharaoh Sekhemkhet's pyramid, which was abandoned due to this ruler's brief reign.

Architecture and engineering

Imhotep was one of the chief officials of the Pharaoh Djoser. Concurring with much later legends, Egyptologists credit him with the design and construction of the Pyramid of Djoser, a step pyramid at Saqqara built during the 3rd Dynasty. He may also have been responsible for the first known use of stone columns to support a building. Despite these later attestations, the pharaonic Egyptians themselves never credited Imhotep as the designer of the stepped pyramid, nor with the invention of stone architecture.

Deification

God of medicine
Two thousand years after his death, Imhotep's status had risen to that of a god of medicine and healing. Eventually, Imhotep was equated with Thoth, the god of architecture, mathematics, and medicine, and patron of scribes: Imhotep's cult was merged with that of his own former tutelary god.

He was revered in the region of Thebes as the "brother" of Amenhotep, son of Hapu – another deified architect – in the temples dedicated to Thoth. Because of his association with health, the Greeks equated Imhotep with Asklepios, their own god of health who also was a deified mortal.

According to myth, Imhotep's mother was a mortal named Kheredu-ankh, she too being eventually revered as a demi-goddess as the daughter of Banebdjedet. Alternatively, since Imhotep was known as the "Son of Ptah", his mother was sometimes claimed to be Sekhmet, the patron of Upper Egypt whose consort was Ptah.

Post-Alexander period
The Upper Egyptian Famine Stela, which dates from the Ptolemaic period (305–30 BCE), bears an inscription containing a legend about a famine lasting seven years during the reign of Djoser. Imhotep is credited with having been instrumental in ending it. One of his priests explained the connection between the god Khnum and the rise of the Nile to the Pharaoh, who then had a dream in which the Nile god spoke to him, promising to end the drought.

A demotic papyrus from the temple of Tebtunis, dating to the 2nd century CE, preserves a long story about Imhotep. The Pharaoh Djoser plays a prominent role in the story, which also mentions Imhotep's family; his father the god Ptah, his mother Khereduankh, and his younger sister Renpetneferet. At one point Djoser desires Renpetneferet, and Imhotep disguises himself and tries to rescue her. The text also refers to the royal tomb of Djoser. Part of the legend includes an anachronistic battle between the Old Kingdom and the Assyrian armies where Imhotep fights an Assyrian sorceress in a duel of magic.

As an instigator of Egyptian culture, Imhotep's idealized image lasted well into the Roman period. In the Ptolemaic period, the Egyptian priest and historian Manetho credited him with inventing the method of a stone-dressed building during Djoser's reign, though he was not the first to actually build with stone. Stone walling, flooring, lintels, and jambs had appeared sporadically during the Archaic Period, though it is true that a building of the size of the step pyramid made entirely out of stone had never before been constructed. Before Djoser, Pharaohs were buried in mastaba tombs.

Medicine
Egyptologist James Peter Allen states that "The Greeks equated him with their own god of medicine, Asklepios, although ironically there is no evidence that Imhotep himself was a physician."

In popular culture
Imhotep is the antagonistic title character of Universal's 1932 film The Mummy, its 1999 remake, and that film's 2001 sequel.

Imhotep was also portrayed in the television show Stargate SG1 as being a false god and an alien known as a Goa’uld.

See also
 Imhotep Museum
 History of ancient Egypt
 Ancient Egyptian architecture
 Ancient Egyptian medicine
 List of Egyptian Architects

References

Further reading

External links

 

27th-century BC births
27th-century BC clergy
Ancient Egyptian architects
Ancient Egyptian engineers
Ancient Egyptian physicians
Deified Ancient Egyptian people
Djoser
Egyptian civil engineers
Egyptian gods
Health gods
High Priests of Re
People of the Third Dynasty of Egypt
Place of birth unknown
Primordial teachers
Wisdom gods